The Italian regional elections of 3–4 April 2005 were a major victory (11-2) for the centre-left The Union coalition, led by Romano Prodi. The centre-right coalition, governing in the national government, was defeated in all the regions it held, except for its strongholds in Lombardy and Veneto, whose population is anyway a fourth of Italian population. The elections resulted in the national government, led by Silvio Berlusconi, to acknowledge defeat and open a crisis, which resulted in the formation of Berlusconi III Cabinet, with some ministers being substituted.

Due to a series of bureaucratic issues involving the presentation of the list of Social Alternative in Basilicata, the election there would have been held two weeks later. There, the victory of the centre-left coalition brought the tally to 12-2.

The fact that the centre-left was particularly strong in small regions led to the even result of the 2006 general election.

Overall results

Regional councils

Presidents of the regions

Results by region

Piedmont

Lombardy

Veneto

Liguria

Emilia-Romagna

Tuscany

Umbria

Marche

Lazio

Abruzzo

Campania

Basilicata

Apulia

Calabria

External links
Ministry of the Interior – Electoral Archive

Elections in Italian regions
2005 elections in Italy
April 2005 events in Europe